The Permanent Representative of India to the United Nations  is India's foremost diplomatic representative to the United Nations. The permanent Representative (UN ambassador) is the head of the Permanent Mission of India to the United Nations in New York City.

The current Permanent Representative of India to UN is Ruchira Kamboj, who took charge of the post on August 1, 2022.

List
This is a list of Indian Permanent Representative to the United Nations.

See also

 India and the United Nations
 Official Spokesperson of the Ministry of External Affairs (India)
 List of current Permanent Representatives to the United Nations
 Foreign relations of India
 Diplomatic missions of India

References

External links
 Official website of the Permanent Mission of India to the UN

India
India